The 1911 Michoacán earthquake occurred on June 7 at 04:26 local time (11:02 UTC). The epicenter was located near the coast of Michoacán, Mexico. The earthquake had a magnitude of 7.6 on the moment magnitude scale. 45 people were reported dead. In Mexico City, 119 houses were destroyed. Cracks were reported in Palacio Nacional, Escuela Normal para Maestros, Escuela Preparatoria, Inspección de Policía, and Instituto Geológico. Ciudad Guzmán, the seat of Zapotlán el Grande, Jalisco, suffered great damage.

The earthquake occurred hours before the revolutionary Francisco I. Madero entered Mexico City on the same day, and it was also known as "temblor maderista".

On June 7, 2011, a ceremony was held in Ciudad Guzmán commemorating the centenary of this earthquake.

This earthquake was a megathrust earthquake along the Middle America Trench, a major subduction zone.

See also
List of earthquakes in 1911
List of earthquakes in Mexico

References

External links 

Earthquakes in Mexico
Michoacan
1911 in Mexico
1911 disasters in Mexico